Tego film is an adhesive sheet, used in the manufacture of waterproof plywood. It is applied dry and cured by heat, which allows for high-quality laminates that are free from internal voids and warping. Tego film plywoods were used in aircraft manufacture in Germany during World War II, and the loss of the plant during a 1943 bombing raid was a serious blow to several aircraft projects. Tego film was an invention of the Essen Germany firm of Th. Goldschmidt AG   later Evonik Industries  ) .

Development and use for plywood 
Tego film was developed  as a glue for waterproof plywood. It comprised a paper sheet pre-impregnated with a resole phenolic resin.  heated, assembled between wood veneers and then compressed, a strong and waterproof laminated plywood was formed. Most plywood at this time used other adhesives, such as casein. These adhesives were generally applied as aqueous solutions, which caused warping of thin veneers and made it difficult to achieve a solid laminate without risk of voids. As Tego film was used dry, it gave a high integrity result, solid and without risk of hidden weaknesses. This became an important factor in time, when it was applied to use in aircraft construction.

This adhesive was manufactured by Th. Goldschmidt AG Essen  at their Wuuppertal subsidiary. By 1932 it was being exported worldwide.

Use for aircraft 

The de Havilland Albatross airliner of 1936 had a fuselage of wooden sandwich construction: wafers of birch plywood were spaced apart by a balsa sheet and glued by a casein adhesive. This same construction, but with Aerolite, a urea-formaldehyde adhesive, achieved fame with its wartime use in the DH.98 Mosquito fast bomber. As well as being a construction of light weight and high performance, it also avoided the use of aluminium, a strategic material during wartime, and could use the skills of woodworkers, rather than those of specialised aircraft metalworkers.

When Germany attempted to emulate this aircraft with the Ta 154 Moskito, it used Tego film. Flight testing and development of the first Tego film-bonded prototypes from Summer 1943 to 1944 was highly successful. However RAF bombing of Wuppertal in February 1943 (incidentally one of the first Oboe-equipped Pathfinder squadron bombing raids) had already destroyed the only Th. Goldschmidt AG factory producing Tego film. RAF squadron records show a second raid of 719 aircraft on the night of 29/30th May 1943 on Wuppertal with the primary objective being the Goldschmidt Tego film plant.

For the production aircraft, an ersatz cold adhesive was used, produced by Dynamit AG of Leverkusen. During a test flight on 28 June 1944, one of the two aircraft broke up in flight. Investigation showed that the glue left an acidic residue after curing, that in turn damaged the structure of the timber. Mass production of the aircraft never took place after this.

Another case of an aircraft design whose existence was threatened by the acidic replacement adhesive was the largely wood-structure Heinkel He 162 Spatz, the winner of Nazi Germany's last significant aircraft design competition, for a Volksjäger, or "people's fighter" single engine jet-powered fighter-interceptor as part of the Jägernotprogramm in the concluding months of the war.

Modern use 
The term 'Tego film' remains in use around plywood manufacturing today, although it has become generic. It is now used to refer to the phenolic resins still used for the manufacture of exterior plywood, although no longer indicates manufacture in Germany. Most of the plywood produced of this type is now from Indonesia.

See also
 Aerolite (adhesive)
 Redux (adhesive)
 Duramold

References 

Woodworking adhesives
Aerospace materials
Plywood
Materials